Folake Olowofoyeku  (born 26 October 1983) is a Nigerian actress and musician. She currently stars in the Chuck Lorre CBS sitcom Bob Hearts Abishola.

Early life, family and education 
Olowofoyeku was born in Nigeria to Nigerian politician Babatunji Olowofoyeku and Felicia Olowofoyeku. She is the youngest of 20 children.  One of her older brothers is the musician and guitarist Toby Foyeh. Olowofoyeku was named after the first female Senior Advocate of Nigeria, Folake Solanke. Olowofoyeku has spoken about the importance of names in Yoruba culture. Her first name means to use non-monetary wealth to pamper, and her surname means a rich man uses a chieftaincy title to top off their wealth.

She was raised on Victoria Island in Lagos, Nigeria, and also spent time in London.

Olowofoyeku attended Igbinedion Education Centre, a Montessori boarding school in Benin City. She then transferred to Vivian Fowler Memorial College for Girls in Ikeja, Lagos and then attended Oxbridge Tutorial College.

In 2001 at the age of 18 years old, Olowofoyeku emigrated to the United States, where she came to live with her sister.

Although initially studying economics in anticipation of becoming an attorney, Olowofoyeku received a B.A. in theater from City College of New York. While she was a student at City College, she played NCAA Division III college basketball for the CCNY Beavers.

Career 
After graduating from college, Olowofoyeku got her start in off-Broadway theater in New York City.

Olowofoyeku appeared in guest starring roles on television shows that include 30 Rock, How to Get Away with Murder, Law & Order: Criminal Intent, Law & Order: Special Victims Unit, Modern Family, Westworld, and White Collar.

Olowofoyeku starred in the 2017 film Death Race 2050 as Minerva Jefferson. The film is a sequel to the 1975 cult film, Death Race 2000, and was shot in Lima, Peru.

Also in 2017, Olowofoyeku appeared opposite Gaby Hoffmann in the last season of the TV series Transparent, as her love interest, Lyfe.

In September 2019, Olowofoyeku co-stars opposite American comedian Billy Gardell in the Chuck Lorre CBS sitcom, Bob Hearts Abishola, which Lorre created with British-Nigerian comedian Gina Yashere – who writes for the show and plays Olowofoyeku's character's best friend, Kemi. Bob Hearts Abishola premiered in 2019 and is the first American sitcom to feature a Nigerian family.

Music 
Olowofoyeku plays Afro-beat electronic music under the moniker The Folake. She plays guitar and  piano. She has also worked as a sound engineer. Olowofoyeku has a diploma in audio engineering from the Institute of Audio Research.

In 2013, Olowofoyeku appeared in two David Bowie videos as his bass guitar player: "The Stars (Are Out Tonight)" and "The Next Day". Both videos were directed by Floria Sigismondi. Tilda Swinton portrays Bowie's wife in "The Stars", and "Next Day" features actors Gary Oldman and Marion Cotillard. Olowofoyeku said that director Sigismondi and Bowie worked with the band so they could learn their parts musically in rehearsal, as well as portray themselves in the videos.

Personal life 
Olowofoyeku speaks fluent Yoruba and English. She resides in Los Angeles. She is a big fan of science fiction and the work of Octavia Butler, and counts Butler's 1980 book, Wild Seed, as a favorite.

Filmography

Film/Movie

Television

Video Games

Music Videos

Theater 
 2004: Trojan Women by Euripides at Classical Theatre of Harlem (2 April 2004)
 2009: Punk Roc/Love Song (Horse Trade Theater Group) at Kraine Theater (30 September – 3 October 2009)

Discography 
 2012: The.Folake! (self-released)

References

External links 
 
 

1983 births
African-American actresses
American people of Yoruba descent
American voice actresses
Living people
21st-century Nigerian actresses
City College of New York alumni
Nigerian emigrants to the United States
Nigerian women musicians
People from Lagos
Vivian Fowler Memorial College for Girls alumni
Yoruba actresses
21st-century African-American people
20th-century African-American people
20th-century African-American women
21st-century African-American women
Residents of Lagos